Sciaenochromis is a genus of haplochromine cichlids endemic to Lake Malawi in East Africa. The species are popular in the aquarium hobby, most notably S. fryeri.

Only males possess the impressive, electric blue coloration, while females are dull grey, and generally similar to the females of Aulonocara species. All Sciaenochromis are piscivores (fish-eaters) and prey mainly upon the fry of mbuna and other haplochromine cichlids.

Species
There are currently four recognized species in this genus:

In the aquarium

Like all cichlids from Lake Malawi, they are best maintained in hard, alkaline water. Sciaenochromis are best kept in tanks with volumes greater than 210 L (55 gal). This is an aggressive fish, and the minimum tank size of 210 litres is only acceptable with a trio of 1 male and 2 females. When more than one male is kept, experts recommend a minimum tank size of  being the minimum. Males can also display aggression towards similarly-coloured fish of other species, for example Aulonocara or Placidochromis. its better to be careful having an 'Electric Blue Hap' in an aquarium.

References

 
Haplochromini

Fishkeeping
Cichlid genera
Taxa named by Ethelwynn Trewavas